Cowboy Commandos is a 1943 American Western film directed by S. Roy Luby and written by Elizabeth Beecher. The film is the twenty-second in Monogram Pictures' "Range Busters" series, and it stars Ray "Crash" Corrigan as Dusty, Dennis Moore as Denny and Max Terhune as Alibi, with Evelyn Finley, Johnny Bond and Budd Buster. The film was released on June 4, 1943.

Plot

Cast
Ray "Crash" Corrigan as Crash Corrigan 
Dennis Moore as Denny Moore 
Max Terhune as Alibi Terhune 
Evelyn Finley as Joan Cameron
Johnny Bond as Slim
Budd Buster as William Werner
John Merton as Larry Fraser
Frank Ellis as Mario
Steve Clark as Dan Bartlett
Edna Bennett as Katie Werner
Bud Osborne as Hans
George Chesebro as Fred

See also
The Range Busters series:
 The Range Busters (1940)
 Trailing Double Trouble (1940)
 West of Pinto Basin (1940)
 Trail of the Silver Spurs (1941)
 The Kid's Last Ride (1941)
 Tumbledown Ranch in Arizona (1941)
 Wrangler's Roost (1941)
 Fugitive Valley (1941)
 Saddle Mountain Roundup (1941)
 Tonto Basin Outlaws (1941)
 Underground Rustlers (1941)
 Thunder River Feud (1942)
 Rock River Renegades (1942)
 Boot Hill Bandits (1942)
 Texas Trouble Shooters (1942)
 Arizona Stage Coach (1942)
 Texas to Bataan (1942)
 Trail Riders (1942)
 Two Fisted Justice (1943)
 Haunted Ranch (1943)
 Land of Hunted Men (1943)
 Cowboy Commandos (1943)
 Black Market Rustlers (1943)
 Bullets and Saddles (1943)

References

External links
 

1943 films
1940s English-language films
American Western (genre) films
1943 Western (genre) films
Monogram Pictures films
Films directed by S. Roy Luby
American black-and-white films
Range Busters
1940s American films